Luitemaa Nature Reserve is a nature reserve situated in south-western Estonia, in Pärnu County.

Geography
Luitemaa Nature Reserve is situated by the coast and displays a variety of nature types, like coastal meadows rich in bird-life, post-glacial sand dunes covered in pine forest, and large bogs. Among the plants and animals found in the reserve, Gladiolus imbricatus and the Natterjack Toad can be mentioned. There are facilities for visitors such as a bird tower and nature trail in the reserve.

Gallery

References

External links
 Luitemaa Nature Reserve at Rannatee.ee

Nature reserves in Estonia
Geography of Pärnu County
Saarde Parish
Häädemeeste Parish
Wetlands of Estonia
Tourist attractions in Pärnu County
Landforms of Pärnu County
Ramsar sites in Estonia